The year 1903 in film involved many significant events in cinema.

Events
 Thomas Edison demolishes "America's First Movie Studio", the Black Maria.
 The three elder Warner Bros. begin in the exhibition business and open their first theater, the Cascade.
 Gaston Méliès, Georges' brother, opens a branch of Star Film in New York to defend its production's copyrights.
 Adolph Zukor and Marcus Loew partner with Mitchell Mark to expand his chain of movie theaters.
 William N. Selig's war film A Soldier's Dream is released. The film shows soldiers playing cards and music around a campfire. Scholars have speculated that the double-exposed image used to create one soldier's dream sequence may have been inspired by Méliès.

Films released in 1903

A
 Alice in Wonderland, directed by Cecil Hepworth and Percy Stow, based on the 1865 novel by Lewis Carroll – (GB)
 The Apparition (Le Revenant), directed by Georges Méliès – (France)

C
 Capital Execution (Henrettelsen), directed by Peter Elfelt – (Denmark)
 A Chess Dispute, directed by Robert W. Paul – (GB)

D
 The Damnation of Faust, directed by Georges Méliès – (France)
 A Daring Daylight Burglary, by Frank Mottershaw – (GB)
 Desperate Poaching Affray, directed by William Haggar – (GB)
 Diving Lucy, produced by Mitchell and Kenyon – (GB)

E
 Electrocuting an Elephant, directed by Edwin S. Porter – (US)
 The Enchanted Well (Le Puits fantastique), directed by Georges Méliès – (France)
 An Extraordinary Cab Accident, directed by Robert W. Paul – (GB)

F
 Faust and Mephistopheles, directed by Alice Guy – (France)
 From Show Girl to Burlesque Queen, directed by A. E. Weed – (US)

G
 The Gay Shoe Clerk, directed by Edwin S. Porter – (US)
 The Georgetown Loop (Colorado), directed by Billy Bitzer – (US)
 The Great Train Robbery, directed by Edwin S. Porter, starring Broncho Billy Anderson – (US)

H
 Hiawatha, the Messiah of the Ojibway (lost), directed by Joe Rosenthal – (Canada)

I
 The Infernal Cake Walk (Le Cake-Walk infernal), directed by Georges Méliès – (France)
 The Infernal Cauldron (Le Chaudron infernal), directed by Georges Méliès – (France)
 The Inn Where No Man Rests (L'Auberge du bon repos), directed by Georges Méliès – (France)

K
 The Kingdom of the Fairies (Le Royaume des fées), directed by Georges Méliès – (France)

L
 Life and Passion of the Christ (Vie et Passion du Christ), directed by Lucien Nonguet and Ferdinand Zecca – (France)
 Life of an American Fireman, directed by Edwin S. Porter – (US)

M
 The Magic Lantern (La Lanterne magique), directed by Georges Méliès – (France)
 Mary Jane's Mishap, directed by George Albert Smith – (GB)
 The Melomaniac (Le Mélomane), directed by Georges Méliès – (France)
 A Message from Mars (lost), by Franklyn Barrett – (NZ)
 Misfortune Never Comes Alone (Un malheur n'arrive jamais seul), directed by Georges Méliès – (France)
 Momijigari (Viewing Scarlet Maple Leaves), directed by Tsunekichi Shibata, based on the 15th century kabuki play by Kanze Nobumitsu – (Japan)
 The Monster (Le Monstre), directed by Georges Méliès – (France)
 The Mysterious Box (La Boîte à malice), directed by Georges Méliès – (France)

O
 Old London Street Scenes, directed by George Albert Smith – (GB)
 The Oracle of Delphi (L'Oracle de Delphes), directed by Georges Méliès – (France)

P
 Panorama of Beach and Cliff House, produced by the American Mutoscope and Biograph Company – (US)
 Petticoat Lane  – (GB)

R
 Rip Van Winkle, directed by William K. L. Dickson, based on the 1819 short story by Washington Irving – (US)
 Runaway Match, directed by Alf Collins  – (GB)

S
 The Sick Kitten, directed by George Albert Smith – (GB)
 Skyscrapers of New York City, from the North River, directed by J.B. Smith – (US)
 A Spiritualistic Photographer (La Portrait Spirite), directed by Georges Méliès – (France)

T
 The Terrible Turkish Executioner (Le Bourreau turc),  directed by Georges Méliès – (France)

U
 Uncle Tom's Cabin, directed by Edwin S. Porter, based on the 1852 novel by Harriet Beecher Stowe – (US)

W
 What Happened in the Tunnel, directed by Edwin S. Porter – (US)
 The Witch's Revenge (Le Sorcier), directed by Georges Méliès – (France)

Births

Deaths
 c. February 15 – Julie Verstraete-Lacquet, Flemish actress, dies at 69

Debut
G. M. Anderson

References

 
Film by year